Brian Hetherington (born 14 January 1954) is an Australian former professional rugby league footballer who played in the 1970s and 1980s. He played in the New South Wales Rugby League (NSWRL) competition. He primarily played in the centres. Hetherington played for the Newtown Jets and the Illawarra Steelers.

While attending Figtree High School, Hetherington played for the Australian Schoolboys team in 1972.

Hetherington was selected to represent New South Wales in game I of the 1984 State of Origin series and game II of the 1986 series.

Playing career

Regal Trophy Final appearances
Brian Hetherington played left- in Halifax's 12–24 defeat by Wigan in the 1989–90 Regal Trophy Final during the 1989–90 season at Headingley, Leeds on Saturday 13 January 1990.

Club career
Hetherington played in the club's 1981 Grand Final loss to Parramatta Eels (scoring a try) but joined the newly formed Illawarra Steelers the following year. In 1984 he became the club's first State of Origin player when he was chosen as a reserve and was named Illawarra Steelers player of the year in that season. Hetherington played in one further match for New South Wales, in 1986, before his retirement at the end of the 1988 season.

References

External links
Statistics at rugbyleagueproject.org

1954 births
Living people
Australian rugby league players
City New South Wales rugby league team players
Country New South Wales rugby league team players
New South Wales Rugby League State of Origin players
Newtown Jets players
Illawarra Steelers players
Halifax R.L.F.C. players
Rugby league centres
Rugby league players from Wollongong